Diario Libre is one of the leading newspapers in the Dominican Republic.

Overview
Diario Libre is a free daily Spanish-language Dominican newspaper, founded on May 10, 2001. It is owned by the Dominican business Grupo Diario Libre, and it is part of the Latin American Newspaper Association. Its first editor was Aníbal de Castro from 2001 to 2004, and its editor since 2004 is Adriano Miguel Tejada. It has a national circulation within the Dominican Republic. Monday through Saturday, it has a distribution of 157,830 copies delivered to homes and points of distribution in the National District and other areas including Santo Domingo, Santiago, Puerto Plata, La Vega, Jarabacoa, Bonao, Moca, San Francisco de Macorís, San Pedro de Macorís, La Romana and Higüey.

References

External links
Official website 

Newspapers published in the Dominican Republic
Spanish-language websites
Spanish-language newspapers
Publications established in 2001
2001 establishments in the Dominican Republic